Tech or The Tech may refer to:

 An abbreviation of technology or technician 
Tech Dinghy, an American sailing dinghy developed at MIT
Tech (mascot), the mascot of Louisiana Tech University, U.S.
 Tech (river), in southern France
 "Tech" (Smash), a 2012 episode of TV series Smash
 The Tech (newspaper), newspaper at the Massachusetts Institute of Technology
 The Tech Interactive, formerly The Tech Museum of Innovation, or The Tech, a museum in San Jose, California, U.S.
 Tech Tower, a building at the Georgia Institute of Technology, Atlanta, Georgia, U.S.

See also

USS Tech Jr. (SP-1761), a United States Navy patrol boat in commission in 1917
USS Tech III (SP-1055), a United States Navy patrol boat in commission in 1917
Technical (disambiguation)
Technique (disambiguation)